Brian Robert Clark (3 June 1932 – 16 November 2021) was a British playwright and screenwriter, best known for his play Whose Life Is It Anyway?, which he later adapted into a screenplay.

Biography
Clark was born on 3 June 1932 in Bristol, United Kingdom, the son of a blacksmith. Clark was educated at the University of Nottingham. He married Maggie Clark, his first wife, and raised two sons. Clark taught in schools, colleges and universities and was a member of the Drama Department at the University of Hull from 1968 to 1972.

In 1970, he sold a television play, Rubber? Some years after its television production, he adapted the script for the stage.  The reworked version won a Society of West End Theaters Award in 1978. Later that year, he brought the play to the United States, first at the Folger in Washington, D.C., followed by its Broadway debut the following year. In 1975 he wrote Whose Life is it Anyway a play exploring the theme of assisted suicide. Clark subsequently adapted the piece into a film released in 1981. He wrote other television plays including Easy Go, Operation Magic Carpet, The Saturday Party, and The Country Party. Clark wrote the first episode of All Creatures Great and Small (1978). The television series Telford's Change (1979), concerns an international banker downsizing to being a branch manager, the central role being performed by Peter Barkworth. 

Clark also wrote Group Theatre, published in 1971 by Theatre Arts Books, in which he summarized the group theatre movement and outlined three approaches to group theatre. He was also the founder of Amber Press Publishers. Clark latterly lived in Brighton with his second wife, a writer and therapist. He died from an aortic aneurysm on 16 November 2021, at the age of 89.

Awards and nominations
1978 Society of West End Theaters Award for ‘’Whose Life Is It Anyway?’’
1979 Selection, The Burns Mantle Theatre Yearbook, The Best Plays of 1978-1979 for ‘’Whose Life Is It Anyway?’’
1979 Tony Award nominee, Best Play for ‘’Whose Life Is It Anyway?’’

References

External links

1932 births
2021 deaths
Alumni of the University of Nottingham
English dramatists and playwrights
English screenwriters
English male screenwriters
English television writers
Fellows of the Royal Society of Literature
English male dramatists and playwrights
British male television writers
Writers from Bournemouth